Beta-1,4-mannosyl-glycoprotein 4-beta-N-acetylglucosaminyltransferase is an enzyme that in humans is encoded by the MGAT3 gene.

There are believed to be over 100 different glycosyltransferases involved in the synthesis of protein-bound and lipid-bound oligosaccharides. The enzyme encoded by this gene transfers a GlcNAc residue to the beta-linked mannose of the trimannosyl core of N-linked oligosaccharides and produces a bisecting GlcNAc. Multiple alternatively spliced variants, encoding the same protein, have been identified.

References

Further reading